Run, Buddy, Run was an American comedy TV series that aired on CBS for one season of 16 episodes in 1966-1967. The series was created by Leonard B. Stern, and starred jazz trumpeter, singer, and actor Jack Sheldon.

Description
At a steambath, accountant Buddy Overstreet (Sheldon) overhears gangster “Mr. D” (Bruce Gordon) plotting a murder. Mr. D and his mob realize that Buddy is a potential witness, and pursue him across the country.

The series was essentially a comedic version of The Fugitive.  It was cancelled by CBS after airing 16 episodes.

Merchandising
The TV series was adapted into a comic book distributed by Gold Key Comics. Only one issue was published.

References

External links
 
Run, Buddy, Run opening on YouTube

1966 American television series debuts
1960s American sitcoms
CBS original programming
English-language television shows
Television shows adapted into comics
Television series by CBS Studios